Jens Langkniv is a 1940 Danish film directed by Per Knutzon and Peter Lind and starring Poul Reichhardt.

Cast
 Asbjørn Andersen
 Valborg Bagger
 Grete Bendix
 Kirsten Elsass
 Ejner Federspiel
 Aage Foss
 Karl Goos
 Bjarne Henning-Jensen
 Harald Holst
 Einar Juhl
 Valdemar Lund - Vicar Philip
 Poul Reichhardt - Jens Langkniv
 Valdemar Skjerning
 Helmuth Strøm
 Gunnar Strømvad

External links

1940 films
1940s Danish-language films
Danish black-and-white films
Danish historical drama films
1940s historical drama films